Gel-e Espid (also Romanized as Gel-e Espīd; also known as Gelā Sefīd) is a village in Alan Rural District, in the Central District of Sardasht County, West Azerbaijan Province, Iran. In the 2006 census, it had a population of 49 people, each belonging to one of 7 the families in the village.

References 

Populated places in Sardasht County